Blue Bossa is a 1991 album by McCoy Tyner released on the LRC label. It was recorded in February 1991 and features performances by Tyner with bassist Avery Sharpe, drummer Aaron Scott, percussionist Raphael Cruz and trumpeter  Claudio Roditi. The Allmusic review by Ken Dryden states "Although Tyner is in top form throughout, this is not an important release in his considerable discography, but its low price makes it worth acquiring".

Track listing
All compositions by McCoy Tyner except where noted.
 "Blue Bossa" (Kenny Dorham) – 9:57
 "Recife's Blues" (Claudio Roditi) – 5:49
 "I'll Take Romance" (Oscar Hammerstein II, Ben Oakland) – 7:45
 "Rotunda" – 6:49
 "We'll Be Together Again" (Carl T. Fischer, Frankie Laine) – 8:21
 "The Natural Bridge" (Roditi) – 8:17
 "Traces" – 8:33

Personnel
 McCoy Tyner – piano
 Claudio Roditi – trumpet, flugelhorn
 Avery Sharpe – bass
 Aaron Scott – drums
 Raphael Cruz – percussion

References

McCoy Tyner albums
1991 albums